Chang Ye-na (born 13 December 1989) is a South Korean badminton player who specializes in doubles. She competed at the 2016 Summer Olympics in Rio de Janeiro, Brazil. She won gold medals at the 2013 Kazan Universiade in the mixed team and women's doubles event partnered with Kim So-yeong. She also won silver medal at the 2013 BWF World Championships with Eom Hye-won. In 2017, she helped the Korean national team to win the world team championships at the Sudirman Cup.

Achievements

BWF World Championships 
Women's doubles

Asian Championships 
Women's doubles

Mixed doubles

Summer Universiade 
Women's doubles

BWF World Tour (2 titles, 3 runners-up) 
The BWF World Tour, which was announced on 19 March 2017 and implemented in 2018, is a series of elite badminton tournaments sanctioned by the Badminton World Federation (BWF). The BWF World Tour is divided into levels of World Tour Finals, Super 1000, Super 750, Super 500, Super 300 (part of the HSBC World Tour), and the BWF Tour Super 100.

Women's doubles

BWF Superseries (2 titles, 6 runners-up) 
The BWF Superseries, which was launched on 14 December 2006 and implemented in 2007, was a series of elite badminton tournaments, sanctioned by the Badminton World Federation (BWF). BWF Superseries levels were Superseries and Superseries Premier. A season of Superseries consisted of twelve tournaments around the world that had been introduced since 2011. Successful players were invited to the Superseries Finals, which were held at the end of each year.

Women's doubles

Mixed doubles

  BWF Superseries Premier tournament
  BWF Superseries tournament

BWF Grand Prix (9 titles, 9 runners-up) 
The BWF Grand Prix had two levels, the Grand Prix and Grand Prix Gold. It was a series of badminton tournaments sanctioned by the Badminton World Federation (BWF) and played between 2007 and 2017.

Women's doubles

Mixed doubles

  BWF Grand Prix Gold tournament
  BWF Grand Prix tournament

BWF International Challenge/Series (2 runners-up) 
Women's doubles

  BWF International Challenge tournament
  BWF International Series tournament

References

External links 
 
 
 

1989 births
Living people
Badminton players from Seoul
South Korean female badminton players
Badminton players at the 2016 Summer Olympics
Olympic badminton players of South Korea
Badminton players at the 2010 Asian Games
Badminton players at the 2014 Asian Games
Asian Games silver medalists for South Korea
Asian Games bronze medalists for South Korea
Asian Games medalists in badminton
Medalists at the 2010 Asian Games
Medalists at the 2014 Asian Games
Universiade gold medalists for South Korea
Universiade medalists in badminton
Medalists at the 2011 Summer Universiade
Medalists at the 2013 Summer Universiade